Elli Ingram (born 14 July 1993) is an English singer-songwriter. Her musical style is influenced by Amy Winehouse, Lauryn Hill, Angie Stone and Erykah Badu.

Career

Early life
Elli Ingram was born 14 July 1993 in Brighton, England. She grew up in a very musical household. Her father performed in a band, her mother enjoyed listening to Joni Mitchell, Reggae and Ska, and her sister played the piano. At the age of 14, a teacher entered Ingram into a talent show which she won. At the age of 18, she began to post YouTube videos of song covers. Her cover of Kendrick Lamar's "Poetic Justice" has more than a million views.

2013–present
In 2013, Ingram toured through Europe with the English drum 'n' bass duo Chase & Status and was featured on their album Brand New Machine. In July she released her first EP titled Sober through Chase & Status' MTA label as a free digital download. The EP earned a Best Newcomer nomination at the MOBO Awards and a music video for the song "Mad Love", directed by Emil Nava, was nominated for Best Pop Video at the UK Music Video Awards 2013.

In 2014, her second EP The Doghouse was released on Island Records. A promotional single titled "When It Was Dark" was also released, accompanied by a music video, once again directed by Emil Nava.

On 15 September 2017, Ingram's first album Love You Really was released. With it came a promotional music video by British art photographer and filmmaker Nadia Lee Cohen.

Discography

Albums

EPs

Music videos

References

External links
 

1993 births
Living people
English women singer-songwriters
English soul singers
21st-century English women singers
21st-century English singers